The PFL Europe 1 mixed martial arts event for the 2023 season of the Professional Fighters League Europe was held on March 25, 2023, at the Vertu Motors Arena in Newcastle, England. This was the inaugural event of the PFL Europe league, holding bouts in the Light Heavyweight and Women's Flyweight

Background 
Starting in 2023 PFL Europe will feature young European MMA fighters, broadcast during prime local hours with all events staged in Europe. The format will follow the same as the regular PFL Season, with the winner receiving a $100,000 prize and a chance to earn a spot in the 2024 PFL regular season.

Fight card

Standings After Event 
The PFL points system is based on results of the match.  The winner of a fight receives 3 points.  If the fight ends in a draw, both fighters will receive 1 point. The bonus for winning a fight in the first, second, or third round is 3 points, 2 points, and 1 point respectively. The bonus for winning in the third round requires a fight be stopped before 4:59 of the third round.  No bonus point will be awarded if a fighter wins via decision.  For example, if a fighter wins a fight in the first round, then the fighter will receive 6 total points. A decision win will result in three total points.  If a fighter misses weight, the opponent (should they comply with weight limits) will receive 3 points due to a walkover victory, regardless of winning or losing the bout;  if the non-offending fighter subsequently wins with a stoppage, all bonus points will be awarded.

Light Heavyweight

Women's Flyweight

See also 

 List of PFL events
 List of current PFL fighters

References 

Professional Fighters League
2023 in mixed martial arts
March 2023 sports events in the United Kingdom
Sport in Newcastle upon Tyne
Scheduled mixed martial arts events